The American Board of Opticianry (ABO) is a national professional organization dedicated to certifying opticians. It has a sister organization, known as the N.C.L.E.- National Contact Lens Examiners.

From the website:

ABO and NCLE are national not-for-profit organizations for the voluntary certification of ophthalmic dispensers.
ABO, the American Board of Opticianry, certifies opticians – those who dispense and work with spectacles.
NCLE, the National Contact Lens Examiners, certifies those ophthalmic dispensers who fit and work with contact lenses.

Both groups administer testing for certification four times a year in February, May, August, and November and are considered not-for-profit even though a fee of $225, price updated 01/2012, (per test) is required in order to be able to take the certification test. A certification renewal is required every 3 years and is attached to an $125 fee and twelve Continuing Education credits. Failure to renew before the expiration date will force the optician to sit for the certification exam again.

Upon successful completion of the exam an optician receives a personalized certificate.

References

External links
 ABO / NCLE

American opticians
Health care-related professional associations based in the United States
Eye care in the United States
Organizations established in 1979
Healthcare accreditation organizations in the United States